Sebastián Quintero (born 4 June 1983) is a Colombian former professional tennis player.

Quintero, a Colombian Davis Cup squad member, spent his professional career competing mostly in ITF Futures tournaments. Amongst his occasional ATP Challenger appearances he won a doubles title at the Bancolombia Open in 2004. He reached career best rankings of 751 for singles and 546 for doubles.

ATP Challenger titles

Doubles: (1)

References

External links
 
 

1983 births
Living people
Colombian male tennis players
21st-century Colombian people